Tappeh Bashi-ye Namaz (also Romanized as Tappeh Bāshī-ye Namāz; also known as Tapa Bashi, Tappeh Bāshī, Tappeh Bāshī-ye Namāzī, Tappeh Bāshī-ye Pūrnāk, and Tepebashi) is a village in Yowla Galdi Rural District, in the Central District of Showt County, West Azerbaijan Province, Iran. At the 2006 census, its population was 87, in 25 families.

References 

Populated places in Showt County